William Franklin Wight (born 18 June 1874 in Allegan, Michigan - died 2 February 1954) was an American botanist. Wight studied at Michigan State College and Stanford University.

References

1874 births
1954 deaths
Stanford University alumni
American botanists
People from Allegan, Michigan